Alejandro Rodríguez Gorrín (born 1 August 1993), also known as Alex Rodríguez, is a Spanish professional footballer who plays as a central midfielder for Oxford United.

Rodríguez was born in Tenerife and played youth football with Sunderland before starting his professional career with Wellington Phoenix.

Early life
Rodríguez was born in Tenerife.

Career
Rodríguez was a member of Premier League club Sunderland's youth system for several years, including as captain of the youth team. After being released by Sunderland in 2014, Rodríguez signed with New Zealand-based A-League club Wellington Phoenix. In July 2014, Rodríguez scored his first Phoenix goal in a pre-season friendly win over Premier League side West Ham United after earlier setting up the opening goal. Alex made his competitive debut for Wellington in the side's loss to Perth Glory in the opening round of the 2014–15 A-League.

On 6 June 2017, Rodríguez signed with Portuguese club Boavista.

After a spell with Romanian club Sepsi OSK, Rodríguez signed for Scottish Premiership club Motherwell in June 2018.

On 20 June 2019, Rodríguez signed a two-year contract with Oxford United, with the option of a third, on a free transfer after his Motherwell deal had expired. He made his Oxford debut in a 1–1 draw at Sunderland on the opening day of the 2019–20 season. Rodríguez scored his first goal for Oxford United on 24 November 2020, scoring from the penalty spot to secure a 1–1 draw with Portsmouth. He signed a new one-year deal at the end of the 2021–22 season having missed the second half of the season with a knee injury.

Career statistics

See also
List of foreign A-League players
List of Wellington Phoenix FC players

References

1993 births
Living people
People from Tenerife
Sportspeople from the Province of Santa Cruz de Tenerife
Spanish footballers
Association football midfielders
Sunderland A.F.C. players
Wellington Phoenix FC players
Boavista F.C. players
Sepsi OSK Sfântu Gheorghe players
Motherwell F.C. players
New Zealand Football Championship players
A-League Men players
Primeira Liga players
Liga I players
Scottish Professional Football League players
Spanish expatriate footballers
Spanish expatriate sportspeople in England
Expatriate footballers in England
Spanish expatriate sportspeople in New Zealand
Expatriate association footballers in New Zealand
Spanish expatriate sportspeople in Portugal
Expatriate footballers in Portugal
Spanish expatriate sportspeople in Romania
Expatriate footballers in Romania
Expatriate footballers in Scotland
Oxford United F.C. players